Pelagodes proquadraria is a moth of the family Geometridae. It is found in Japan, China and Taiwan.

The larvae are a pest on Litchi chinensis.

References

Moths described in 1976
Hemitheini
Moths of Japan